CeFaan Kim is an American journalist of Korean descent. He is currently an ABC News correspondent and reporter for WABC-TV in New York City. Previously, he worked as a reporter for News 12 Westchester/Hudson Valley and as a field producer for NY1 News, where he covered local politics and breaking news.

Personal life 
CeFaan Kim was born and raised in Philadelphia, Pennsylvania. He graduated from New York University in 2004 with a bachelor's degree in broadcast journalism. He is a U.S. veteran who served as an Army Reserve Sergeant.

Career 
Kim started his career in 2003 as a field producer for NY1 News in New York City. While there, he covered several major political events, including the 2008 presidential campaigns of Hillary Clinton, Rudy Giuliani and Barack Obama. Kim later joined News 12 Westchester/Hudson Valley in 2012, where he worked as a reporter. He most notably covered the deadly Metro-North crash in 2015.

In September 2015, Kim joined Eyewitness News. In addition to breaking news coverage, he also reported extensively on poverty in the Asian American community in New York. In December 2016, Kim reported exclusively on Asian American seniors who ride casino buses to make ends meet. His coverage on the Asian American community continued throughout the COVID-19 pandemic, when he reported heavily on anti-Asian crimes and racism that emerged as a consequence.

In October 2020, amid the rise in anti-Asian racism, Kim was called a racial slur while reporting on a large gathering in Brooklyn, which violated a state executive order. He later revealed such attacks felt personal to him because his mother was once mugged. Kim was attacked twice on the job in the years prior. In 2017, he was attacked during a live broadcast. The attacker was later identified as Key Jonta Foster. In 2013, he was hospitalized following an attack in Yonkers by four teenagers who were later arrested.

In May 2021, ABC News announced that CeFaan Kim would be joining as a correspondent, splitting his time between the legacy news organization and WABC-TV. In addition to reporting, Kim serves as a member of the Asian American Journalists Association's MediaWatch group.

Awards 
Kim was honored by Gold House in May 2021. Kim was among 100 API leaders who were recognized for their impact in advocacy, journalism and other categories.

Appearances 
In January 2020, Kim emceed the 60th Korean American Nigh Gala Fundraiser.

References 

American journalists
Living people
Year of birth missing (living people)